Foreign relations exist between Armenia and China. The first references to Armenian-Chinese contact are found in the works of 5th-century historian Moses of Chorene and 6th-century geographer and mathematician Anania Shirakatsi. The People's Republic of China officially recognized Armenia on December 27, 1991. Diplomatic relations between Armenia and the People's Republic of China were established on April 6, 1992. The Embassy of China to Armenia was established in July 1992, while the Embassy of Armenia to China started its activities on August 10, 1996. The Armenian Ambassador to China resides in the Beijing embassy.

Presidents of Armenia Levon Ter-Petrosyan and Robert Kocharyan visited the P.R. of China in May 1996 and September 2004. President Serzh Sargsyan was in China in May 2010 to participate in the opening ceremony of the "Shanghai World Expo 2010". High-level visits from China to Armenia included members of the Politburo Standing Committee of the Chinese Communist Party Luo Gan, in September 2003, and Li Changchun, in April 2011.

History 
The first relations between the Armenian and Chinese people can be traced back to around AD 1000. In Chinese, “Armenia” is pronounced “Ya-mei-ni-ya.” These four characters literally mean “the beautiful maid of Asia.” In Armenian legends and fairy tales, China is called the country of Chenes, Chinumachin, or Chinastan. Some ancient Armenian literary works have traces of Chinese cultural icons. For example, there are qilin, fenghuang and dharmachakra designs in the Armenian Bible.

Armenians visited China for trade and imported silk, porcelain, jade, embroidered fabrics and other goods to bring back to Armenia via the Silk Road. In China, there was high demand for Armenian medicine, vegetables, mineral paints, and insects, especially the Armenian cochineal, which was used to dye the best Chinese and Indian silks.

The Chinese porcelains and celadonite that were discovered during archeological excavations of the Armenian cities of Garni, Dvin, Ani, and the Amberd fortress are evidence of early-medieval Armenian-Chinese economic trade.

Movses Khorenatsi, Anania Shirakatsi, Stepanos Orbelian, and King Hethum I of Armenia wrote about China, Chinese culture, and the Chinese people.

During the time of the Mongol Empire, the relations between Armenia and China were furthered. Many Armenians began to settle in China. In 1688 the British East India Company agreed to permit Armenians access to Chinese maritime trade. The Armenians made full usage of this agreement with the British established maritime trade hubs in Shanghai and Macao.

On 27 December 1991, China officially recognized Armenia as an independent state. On April 6, 1992, many Central Asian countries established diplomatic relations with China. In July 1992, China established an embassy in the Armenian Capital of Yerevan. In 1996, Armenia established their  embassy in Beijing.

Trade and economic relations

Trade turnover (mln. US dollars) 

The data in the chart above shows that the trade volume between Armenia and China, although still relatively small, has grown significantly over the last decade and exceeded US$400 million by 2008. There was a significant slump in trade volume in 2009, probably due to the financial crisis of 2007-08. Trade volume increased, exceeding US$400 million for two consecutive years in 2010 and 2011.

Armenia's main export is ore, while the products imported from China to Armenia are diverse and include clothes, shoes, machinery, chemicals, equipment, construction materials, furniture, food etc.

Industry 

In May 2010, Shanna (Shanxi-Nairit) Synthetic Rubber Co., jointly funded by Shanxi Synthetic Rubber Group and Armenia's Nairit LLC, was established and started production.  Armenia's president attended the inauguration of the Shanxi-Nairit joint venture, marking the commencement of the company's chloroprene rubber production in Datong. Shanxi-Nairit joint venture was created based on an agreement signed in 2003 by the Shanxi Synthetic Rubber Company (China) and Nairit LLC (RA). Nairit LLC holds 40 percent of Shanxi-Nairit's shares.

China and Armenia have signed some bilateral cooperation agreements related to agriculture and scientific research, including the "Xinjiang-Armenia Top-quality Fruit Tree Planting Technical Cooperation", the "Central Asian Sci-Tech Exchange and Cooperation on Grapes", and the "Study on Vinyl Acetate and Its Byproducts".

Education and Culture 

The Chinese and Armenian governments have agreed to send 15 exchange students to study in each other's country each year. However, the two countries have not yet signed an agreement ensuring that the exchange students can receive credit for their work complete abroad. At present, there are no direct flights between Armenia and China.[11].

Every year, China celebrates Armenian Cultural Day and Armenia celebrates Chinese Cultural Day. Armenians are very interested in Chinese culture and enjoy a variety of Chinese theatrical performances.

Confucius Institute opened at Yerevan State Linguistic University in 2008. Another Confucius Institute opened elsewhere in Armenia. Additionally, in 2018, the Chinese-Armenian Friendship School opened in Yerevan.

Military 
In recent years, the military relations between China and Armenia have steadily become stronger. According to Chang Wanquan, Minister of the PRC's Ministry of Defense, the Chinese and Armenian militaries have maintained the trend of conducting friendly exchanges and pragmatic cooperations, and the Chinese military has promoted the steady development of the relations between the two armed forces. According to Seyran Ohanyan, Defense Minister of Armenia, Armenia regards China as a reliable friend and partner. He expressed satisfaction with the development of the bilateral military relations seen in recent years and he expressed his hopes to promote cooperation between the two militaries in a variety of areas.

In January 2012, China and Armenia signed an agreement, which was described by the Armenian Ministry of Defense as an agreement on military cooperation between the two countries. In 2013, the Armenian Ministry of Defense said that China will provide Armenia with 5 million yuan in military aid each year. In the same year, Seyran Ohanyan held talks with Xu Qiang, Vice Chairman of the Central Military Commission, and Chang Wanquan, Minister of the PRC's Ministry of Defense. In 2013, Armenia purchased rockets (with a range of up to ) from China.

Resident diplomatic missions
 Armenia has an embassy in Beijing.
 China has an embassy in Yerevan.

See also 
Foreign relations of Armenia
Foreign relations of China 
Armenians in China

References 

 
China
Bilateral relations of China